Au is a village in the municipality Wädenswil in the district of Horgen in the canton of Zürich in Switzerland.

First mentioned in the year 1130 as "Naglikon" and in 1316 as "Owe", Au belongs politically to the urban area of the south-eastern city of Wädenswil on Lake Zürich.

Transport 
Au ZH railway station is a stop of the S-Bahn Zürich on the line S8. The Au peninsula is a known tourist destination and has a stop on the Zürichsee-Schifffahrtsgesellschaft.

Cultural heritage 

Located on Zürichsee lakeshore, Wädenswil–Vorder Au is part of the 56 Swiss sites of the UNESCO World Heritage Site Prehistoric pile dwellings around the Alps, and the settlement is also listed in the Swiss inventory of cultural property of national and regional significance as a Class object.

The Au château, its auxiliary buildings and the park are listed in the Swiss inventory of cultural property of national and regional significance as a Class B object of regional importance''.

Gallery

References

External links 

 Official website 

Villages in the canton of Zürich
Populated places on Lake Zurich
Wädenswil